Troglophyton is a genus of flowering plants in the family Asteraceae, native to southern Africa.

 Species

References

Gnaphalieae
Asteraceae genera
Flora of Southern Africa